Butembo is a city in North Kivu, in the north eastern Democratic Republic of Congo, lying west of the Virunga National Park.  The city is an important commercial centre with large markets, a cathedral, multiple large hospitals, and an airport. The city is located in a region known for tea and coffee growing. As of 2013 it had an estimated population of 670,285, making it the second largest city in North Kivu.

Overview
Butembo is 90% populated by the Nande tribe, a community distinguished by ethnic solidarity, conservative moral standards and influential leaders.

Ebola
Ebola broke out in August 2018 in North Kivu province. A series of attacks on Ebola treatment centers in Butembo led up to the death of a policeman in March 2019 and of a doctor in April 2019. Locals mistakenly believe aid workers brought the virus to the area. More than 102,000 people received an experimental vaccine in this period, but 843 of 1300 confirmed and probable Ebola patients died. Treatment centers were earlier torched in Butembo and Katwa, and medical professionals threatened to strike.

References

External links
 Butembo in Google Maps
 YouTube Video of Nella Star (2007) Video by Godfried van Loo following Dutch sociologist/anthropologist Nella Star when going back to Butembo after over 30 years. With a lot of footage from the city Butembo and surroundings. Dutch/French spoken and subtitled.

Butembo